Self-Portrait with Hat and Veil is a painting by the German Expression painter Paula Modersohn-Becker. It was painted between 1906-7. It has been described as an impenetrable, secret painting: "the artist stands in front of a draped window, her face both in shadow and covered by a veil, doubly concealing the backlit figure from public viewing. Only the deep V-shape of her garment suggests exposure of any kind, and even there the flower held just at the breast both hints at and denies a fuller view."

It hangs in the Kunstmuseum, in The Hague.

References

Modern paintings
1907 paintings
Paintings by Paula Modersohn-Becker
Collections of the Kunstmuseum, The Hague